Al-Nasr wal-Salam Sport Club, is an Iraqi football team based in Baghdad, that plays in the Iraq Division Three.

Managerial history
 Odah Shukor
 Raed Ismail

See also
 2019–20 Iraq FA Cup
 2020–21 Iraq FA Cup

References

External links
 Al-Nasr wal-Salam SC on Goalzz.com
 Iraq Clubs- Foundation Dates

2003 establishments in Iraq
Association football clubs established in 2003
Football clubs in Baghdad